John O'Flaherty (June 17, 1821December 26, 1886) was an Irish American immigrant and farmer.  He served one term in the Wisconsin State Assembly (1879), representing southern Brown County.

Biography
O'Flaherty was born on June 17, 1821, in Tralee, Ireland. He later moved to Morrison, Wisconsin. He died at Stark in the town of Morrison on December 26, 1886.

Political career
O'Flaherty was elected to the assembly as a representative of Brown County's 3rd district in 1878. He was a Democrat.

Electoral history

Wisconsin Assembly (1878)

| colspan="6" style="text-align:center;background-color: #e9e9e9;"| General Election, November 5, 1878

References

External links

19th-century Irish people
People from County Kerry
Burials in Wisconsin
Irish emigrants to the United States (before 1923)
People from Morrison, Wisconsin
Democratic Party members of the Wisconsin State Assembly
1821 births
1886 deaths
19th-century American politicians
People from Tralee